Tako mlada is the debut studio album by Serbian pop-folk singer Tanja Savić. It was released 16 June 2005 through the Belgrade-based record label Grand Production.

Background
Tanja Savić became famous in 2004 while competing on the first season of the Zvezde Granda television singing contest and making it into the final six.

Singles
The title song was released as the album's lead single in 2005.

Track listing

References

2005 debut albums
Tanja Savić albums
Grand Production albums